is a 1995 Japanese Pink film directed by Toshiki Satō. It was chosen as Best Film of the year at the Pink Grand Prix ceremony. Hotaru Hazuki was given the Best Actress award and cinematographer Yasumasa Konishi won a Technical Award for their work on the film.

Synopsis
A man travels to a countryside town seeking employment. He becomes romantically involved with a woman who cannot smile, and works for her parents' printing company. When he learns that his girlfriend in Tokyo has disappeared he returns to look for her. Screenwriter Kenji Fukuma based the script on his poetry.

Cast
 Hotaru Hazuki
 Kikujirō Honda
 Takeshi Itō
 Yōji Tanaka
 Yumi Yoshiyuki
 Takahiro Hosoya
 Koichi Imaizumi
 Rumine Minamiguchi
 Kazuhiro Ueda
 Takao Iida

Bibliography

English

Japanese

References

1995 films
Films directed by Toshiki Satō
1990s Japanese-language films
Pink films
Shintōhō Eiga films
1990s pornographic films
1990s Japanese films